Acestrorhynchus ("needle jaw" ) is a genus of 14 species of characiform fish found only in fresh water in South America, the sole genus in the family Acestrorhynchidae. Their greatest diversity is in the Orinoco and Amazon basins.

These fish have elongated pike-like bodies and large conical teeth, adapted for predation on other types of fish. They are sometimes referred to as freshwater barracudas in the aquarium trade, although the name is used of other characins, as well. They range from 35 to 400 mm in length.

Common names are cachorinho, cachorro, mopiye, payala, pejezorro, pez cachorro, pez zorro, pike characin, moinge, halatawéi, halataway, dagu fisi, ueua, wayabra, zadoe, freshwater barracuda, saicanga, branca, cajaba, cachorra magra, cadelinha and dentudo.

Species
 Acestrorhynchus abbreviatus (Cope, 1878)
 Acestrorhynchus altus Menezes, 1969
 Acestrorhynchus britskii Menezes, 1969
 Acestrorhynchus falcatus (Bloch, 1794) (freshwater barracuda, spotted cachorro)
 Acestrorhynchus falcirostris (G. Cuvier, 1819) (slender freshwater barracuda, big-eyed cachorro)
 Acestrorhynchus grandoculis Menezes & Géry, 1983
 Acestrorhynchus heterolepis (Cope, 1878)
 Acestrorhynchus isalineae Menezes & Géry, 1983
 Acestrorhynchus lacustris (Lütken, 1875)
 Acestrorhynchus maculipinna Menezes & Géry, 1983
 Acestrorhynchus microlepis (Jardine, 1841) (pike characin)
 Acestrorhynchus minimus Menezes, 1969
 Acestrorhynchus nasutus C. H. Eigenmann, 1912
 Acestrorhynchus pantaneiro Menezes, 1992

External links
 
 Aquarium info

Acestrorhynchidae
Fish of South America